Live at the Roxy is a live album by the Southern California punk rock  group Social Distortion. It was released in 1998, on their own Time Bomb label. It is the last Social Distortion release to feature Dennis Danell, who died in 2000.

Personnel
Mike Ness lead guitar, vocals
Dennis Danell rhythm guitar
John Maurer bass guitar, backing vocals
Chuck Biscuits percussion

Track listing
All songs written by Mike Ness unless otherwise noted.
"Story of My Life" – 6:00
"Bad Luck" – 4:27
"Under My Thumb" (Jagger-Richards) – 2:51
"Prison Bound" – 6:36
"Mommy's Little Monster" – 4:05
"Mass Hysteria" – 3:23
"The Creeps" (Danell, Ness) – 3:03
"Another State of Mind" – 2:51
"Let it Be Me" – 4:29
"No Pain, No Gain" – 3:24
"Cold Feelings" – 3:54
"Telling Them" – 3:58
"I Was Wrong" – 4:01
"1945" – 3:00
"Don't Drag Me Down" – 4:56
"Ball and Chain" – 7:04
"Ring of Fire" (Cash, Kilgore) – 8:32
 Untitled – 0:04

Charts

References

Social Distortion albums
1998 live albums
Time Bomb Recordings live albums
Albums recorded at the Roxy Theatre